The Bishop of Lahore was  the Ordinary of the Church of England in Lahore from its inception in 1877 until the foundation of the Church of India, Burma and Ceylon in 1927; and since then head of one of its most prominent Dioceses. Since 1970, the diocese of Lahore has been a part of the Church of Pakistan, a United Protestant denomination.

List of Bishops
{| class="wikitable" style="width:95%;" border="1" cellpadding="2"
|-
! colspan="4" style="background-color: #7F1734; color: white;" | Bishops of Lahore
|-
! style="background-color: #D4B1BB; width: 10%;" | From
! style="background-color: #D4B1BB; width: 10%;" | Until
! style="background-color: #D4B1BB; width: 33%;" | Incumbent
! style="background-color: #D4B1BB; width: 42%;" | Notes

|- valign="top" style="background-color: white;"
| style="text-align: center;" | 1877
| style="text-align: center;" | 1888
| Valpy French
|
|- valign="top" style="background-color: white;"
| style="text-align: center;" | 1888
| style="text-align: center;" | 1898
| Henry Matthew
| Died in the act of celebrating communion at Lahore Cathedral

|- valign="top" style="background-color: white;"
| style="text-align: center;" | 1899
| style="text-align: center;" | 1912
| George Lefroy
|
|- valign="top" style="background-color: white;"
| style="text-align: center;" | 1913
| style="text-align: center;" | 1932
| Henry Durant
|
|- valign="top" style="background-color: white;"
| style="text-align: center;" | 1932
| style="text-align: center;" | 1949
| George Barne
|
|- valign="top" style="background-color: white;"
| style="text-align: center;" | 1949
| style="text-align: center;" | 1968
| Laurence Woolmer
|
|- valign="top" style="background-color: white;"
| style="text-align: center;" | 1968
| style="text-align: center;" | 1980
| Inayat Masih
| First Bishop of Lahore in the Church of Pakistan

|- valign="top" style="background-color: white;"
| style="text-align: center;" | 1980
| style="text-align: center;" | 2012
| Alexander Malik
|
|- valign="top" style="background-color: white;"
| style="text-align: center;" | 2012
| style="text-align: center;" | 2022
| Irfan Jamil
| consecrated coadjutor bishop in 2011
|- valign="top" style="background-color: white;"
| style="text-align: center;" | 2023
| style="text-align: center;" | incumbent
| Nadeem Kamran
| Consecrated as a bishop in 2023

References

External links
Lahore Cathedral
Anglican Communion
Details of the Diocese

 
Christianity in Lahore
1877 establishments in India
Church of India, Burma and Ceylon